The Capt. Allen H. Bearse House is a historic house located in Barnstable, Massachusetts.

Description and history 
The -story wood-frame house was built in 1857, and is an exceptionally well preserved example of Italianate styling. It features corner pilasters, bracketed eaves and a wraparound porch with bracketed columns. The house was owned by Allen Bearse, a prominent local deep-water ship's captain who also owned a wharf in Hyannis.

The house was listed on the National Register of Historic Places on March 13, 1987.

See also
National Register of Historic Places listings in Barnstable County, Massachusetts

References

Houses in Barnstable, Massachusetts
National Register of Historic Places in Barnstable, Massachusetts
Houses on the National Register of Historic Places in Barnstable County, Massachusetts
Italianate architecture in Massachusetts
Houses completed in 1857
1857 establishments in Massachusetts